Teruhime or Kushihashi Teru (櫛橋 光, 1553 – October 5, 1627) was a Japanese noblewoman and aristocrat of the Sengoku period, who was daimyo Kuroda Yoshitaka's only wife. The daughter of Kushihashi Koresada and the foster daughter of Kodera Masamoto, she was the princess of Shikata Castle in Harima Province. In the Battle of Sekigahara, Ishida Mitsunari planned to take her as a political hostage, but with the help of Toshiyasu Kuriyama, Tahei Mori and others retainers, she was able to hide and escape.

Life 
In the year 1567 she married Kuroda Yoshitaka; she gave birth to Kuroda Nagamasa in 1568 and Kuroda Kumanosuke in 1582. When Bessho Nagaharu rebelled against Oda Nobunaga, the Kushihashi clan sided with Nagaharu.

When the Battle of Sekigahara took place, Ishida Mitsunari detained the daimyo's family as hostages, forcing Hosokawa Gracia to end her own life. Teru fled during the chaos that Gracia's suicide caused. Her husband and son Nagamasa were once Kirishitan (Christian), but Teruhime was a devout of Pure Land Buddhism.

References 

People of Sengoku-period Japan
Women of medieval Japan
16th-century Japanese women
17th-century Japanese women
1553 births
1627 deaths